Nenè is a 1977 Italian drama film directed by Salvatore Samperi. The film is a historical drama, set in post-war Italy in 1948 during the first free elections after the war. It tells of a romance and a coming-of-age amid a difficult family life and amid national political tensions.

The film was an adaptation of the best-selling novel of the same name, written by Cesare Lanza. His novel won the Premio Sila award in 1976.

Plot
Ju is a nine-year-old boy growing up in the aftermath of World War II in Italy. He is observant of the difficulties surrounding him. Both his father and mother have suffered emotionally, though his mother has suffered more due to the ongoing sexual and physical abuse caused by her husband.

Ju's orphaned fifteen-year-old cousin Nenè, comes to live with his family. Through Nenè, Ju learns even more of the strange adult world that he has yet to enter. Nenè allows him to sleep in her bed and confides in him of her growing sexuality and her secret affair with a local Mulatto boy.

Cast
Leonora Fani as Nenè
Sven Valsecchi as Ju
Tino Schirinzi as Father of Ju and Pa
Paola Senatore as Mother of Ju and Pa
Rita Savagnone as Teacher of Ju
Vittoria Valsecchi as Pa
Alberto Cancemi as Rodi
Ugo Tognazzi as "Baffo", the barber

Production notes
The Italian censorship rating for the film is 'suitable for age 14 and above'.

External links
 
 

1977 drama films
1977 films
Films directed by Salvatore Samperi
Films set in 1948
Films set in Italy
Italian coming-of-age films
1970s Italian-language films
1970s Italian films